Juliette is a feminine personal name of French origin. It is a diminutive of Julie.

Notable people
Juliette (Canadian singer) (1926-2017), full name Juliette Augustina Sysak Cavazzi, Canadian singer and TV personality of the 1950s-1970s. known as Juliette
Juliette (French singer) (born 1962), full name Juliette Noureddine, French singer, usually known as Juliette
Juliette (Brazilian singer) (born 1989), full name Juliette Freire Feitosa, Brazilian lawyer, makeup artist and singer
Juliette Adam (1836–1936), also known by her maiden name Juliette Lamber, French author and feminist
Juliette Atkinson (1873–1944), American tennis player
Juliette Walker Barnwell (died 2016), Bahamian educator and public administrator
Juliette Béliveau (1889–1975), French Canadian actress and singer
Juliette Benzoni (born 1920-2016), French novelist 
Juliette Bergmann (born 1958), Dutch IFBB professional bodybuilder
Juliette Binoche, French actress
Juliette Compton (1899–1989), American actress 
Juliette Derricotte (1897-1931), African-American educator and political activist
Juliette Dodu (1848-1909), famous heroine of the Franco-Prussian War of 1870
Juliette Drouet (1806-1883), French actress
Juliette May Fraser (1887-1983), American painter, muralist and printmaker
Juliette Gosselin (born 1991), Canadian actress
Juliette Gréco, French actress and chanson singer
Juliette Heuzey (1865-1952), French writer
Juliette Kemppi, (born 1994), Finnish soccer player
Juliette Augusta Magill Kinzie (1806-1870), American historian, writer and pioneer
Juliette Lewis (born 1973), American actress and musician 
Juliette Gordon Low, founder of Girl Scouts
Juliette Mayniel (born 1936), French actress
Juliette Morillot (born 1959), French journalist
Juliette Peirce (died 1934), second wife of the mathematician and philosopher Charles Sanders Peirce
Juliette Récamier (1777–1849), French socialite 
Juliette Schoppmann (born 1980), German singer
Juliette Simon-Girard (1859–1954), French soprano singer 
Juliette Wells, American author and Jane Austen specialist 
Juliette Jameson, Australian Personality and Historian

Fictional characters
Juliette, a character from the video game Fur Fighters
Juliette, a character from the cartoon Dogtanian and the Three Muskehounds
Juliette Barnes, a character in the musical drama series Nashville
Juliette Silverton, a character in the popular TV series Grimm
Juliette Ferrars, the main character of the YA novel Shatter Me
Juliette Cai, one of the main characters of the YA novel These Violent Delights

See also
Julia (given name)
Julie (given name)
Juliet (given name)

References

French feminine given names